Chelpark Company Private Ltd. is an Indian manufacturing company of stationery products. Based in Bangalore, Chelpark is one of the oldest manufacturers of fountain pen ink in the country. The company is located in Bangalore, Karnataka.

Originally a subsidiary of the Parker Pen Company in India, the company was renamed 'Chelpark', when the Bangalore-based Chellaram family took over operations.

History 
Around the year 1943 the Parker Pen Company wanted to discontinue its partnership with the TTK group. The Chellaram family, who traded in Parker products  in west Africa, we’re asked to associate with Parker for operations in India. After Parker agreed to the terms, both companies commercialised the Quink Parker ink, giving it a local identity for the Indian market. Therefore the brandname "Chelpark" (a portmanteau of "Chellaram" and "Parker") launched. This was supported by an advertising campaign that showed how the Parker label was removed from the bottle, being replaced by a Chelpark one.

The partnership came to an end around 1969 due to changes in policies by the Indian Ministry of Finance. Parker sold its share in the operation as it became unprofitable. From then on, Chelpark (known only for its fountain pen ink) started expanding to other office stationery products. When the Chellaram family acquired the majority shares, it changed to "Chelpark Company Private Ltd." in 1985, setting its headquarters in Bangalore, Karnataka.

References

Fountain pen and ink manufacturers
Indian brands
Manufacturing companies based in Bangalore
Indian companies established in 1943